Rodrigo Fabián Riquelme Cabrera (born 1 June 1984) is a Paraguayan-born Chilean defender.

Riquelme's professional debut came for Paraguayan side Sol de América in 2003. He moved to Rangers de Talca in 2004, and he has played club football in Chile ever since.

Riquelme scored a historic goal against Puerto Montt, leading his club Curicó Unido to promotion to the Chilean Primera División, when he played for Curicó in 2008. He then made a controversial transfer from Curicó to Colo-Colo in December 2008.

Honours

Club
Curicó Unido
 Primera B de Chile (2): 2008, 2016–17

References

External links
 Rodrigo Riquelme at BDFA.com.ar 

1984 births
Living people
Paraguayan footballers
Paraguayan expatriate footballers
Club Sol de América footballers
12 de Octubre Football Club players
Rangers de Talca footballers
Curicó Unido footballers
Colo-Colo footballers
C.D. Antofagasta footballers
Club Deportivo Palestino footballers
San Luis de Quillota footballers
Expatriate footballers in Chile
Paraguayan expatriate sportspeople in Chile
Association football defenders
Naturalized citizens of Chile